Top-seeded pair Scott Davis and David Pate won in the final against second-seeds Jim Grabb and Leonardo Lavalle.

Seeds
Champion seeds are indicated in bold text while text in italics indicates the round in which those seeds were eliminated.

  Scott Davis /  David Pate (champions)
  Jim Grabb /  Leonardo Lavalle (final)
  Brad Pearce /  Richey Reneberg (quarterfinals)
  Broderick Dyke /  Tim Wilkison (quarterfinals)

Draw

References

1990 U.S. Men's Clay Court Championships